Mozambique has a historic Hindu community. Some of their ancestors came to Mozambique at least 500 years ago. Predating their economic participation in Mozambique before the arrival of Vasco da Gama, they adapted during the Portuguese colonial rule. An exodus began during the civil war between 1975 and 1990. After 1990 political and social reforms in Mozambique, the Hindu community along with the other minority religions, have once again begun to become vibrant.

There are four Hindu temples in Mozambique with an estimated number of adherents at around 30,000. Most of the Mozambican Hindus are Goans who migrated to Mozambique from Goa which was a Portuguese colony until 1961.

History
Blanche D'Souza states that Hindus had, by 1st millennium AD, begun using monsoon-led trade winds to establish trading activities between western parts of India and Mozambique, linking these to other eastern coastal regions of Africa and Arabian peninsula. Hindu traders thus arrived in Mozambique, and were settled in Ilha de Moçambique, before Vasco da Gama's maiden visit to Mozambique in 1499, as mentioned in his memoirs. However, since those early times, Hindus in Mozambique have always been a minority. After the 1960s conflict with Portugal on its claim to continued colonial presence in Goa, Daman and Diu, followed by military led annexation of these territories by India, the Portuguese colonial government in Mozambique targeted the resident Hindu community. Their property and bank accounts were confiscated, entire Hindu families placed in a concentration camp, and their citizenship revoked. In 1975 Mozambique gained its independence from Portugal, and shortly thereafter civil war broke out. During this period, thousands of local Hindus migrated to Europe (mostly to Lisbon, Portugal),  some to South Africa and India.

Since 1990 reforms in Mozambique led by Joaquim Chissano, an active Hindu community has once again flourished. The community is largely in commercial and trade operations, and have a Hindu community center in Maputo. Small Hindu temples are present near residential areas of the community. The Mozambique Hindu community has reached out to form socio-cultural associations with Indian communities in Kerala, West Bengal, Goa and Maharashtra.

References

External links
 Pujya Swamiji and Pujya Bhaiji in Mozambique

Mozambique
Mozambique
Religion in Mozambique